Janot Tadjong (born 27 September 1995 in Cameroon) is a Cameroonian footballer.

Career

After playing in Thailand, Tadjong decided to play in Albania with the aim of reaching a better European league, joining second division side Sopoti. However, the club suffered financial problems, so were unable to pay him for months. As a result, he had to rely on friends for dinner and the owner of a pizzeria, who supplied sandwiches.

Sopoti and Terbuni were both relegated after Tadjong left them, in 2016-17 and 2017–18, which may have caused  other managers in Albania to consider him "bad luck".

References

External links
 Janot Tadjong at Soccerway

Cameroonian footballers
Association football midfielders
1995 births
Living people
KF Tërbuni Pukë players